The Cologne–Frankfurt high-speed rail line is a  railway line in Germany, connecting the cities of Cologne and Frankfurt. Its route follows the Bundesautobahn 3 for the greater part, and currently the travel time is about 62 minutes.  The line's grades of up to four percent require trains with a high power-to-weight ratio which is currently only met by third-generation Intercity-Express trains.  It was constructed between 1995 and 2002 at a total cost of six billion Euro according to Deutsche Bahn.

Operational use 
The line starts in Cologne at the Abzweig Köln-Steinstrasse in the Cologne borough of Porz. Whilst the connection loop to Cologne-Bonn Airport, the Cologne Airport loop, is technically not a part of the high-speed line, it was built as a part of the general refurbishments in the Cologne area due to the line, and hence is generally regarded as part of the project.  The line has four stations, Siegburg/Bonn, Montabaur, Limburg Süd and Frankfurt Airport.

History 

The former Deutsche Bundesbahn (DB) began planning for a network of high-speed lines for both passenger and freight trains in the 1960s. The 1973 federal transport plan included a high-speed line between Cologne and Groß-Gerau (near Frankfurt), as well as between Hanover and Würzburg and between Mannheim and Stuttgart. This plan envisaged that mixed traffic would require:
maximum grade of 1.25% (occasionally 2.0%)
curves with small superelevation and minimum radii of 
maximum line speed of 
These specifications would be difficult to achieve either near the traditional Rhine valley route, which follows an entrenched meander, or along DB's preferred route next to the A3, which has long and steep climbs and descents.  The second federal transport plan in 1985 (which was drawn up when the first TGV line had been operating for four years) included a passenger train-only railway, which meant that much steeper grades would be acceptable.  The technical standards adopted were:
maximum grade : 4.0%
minimum radius : 
maximum speed : 

DB negotiated with the states of North Rhine-Westphalia, Rhineland-Palatinate and Hesse over the route. Each state had objections to the bypassing of the cities on the Rhine, particularly Bonn, Andernach, Koblenz, Mainz and Wiesbaden and four other routes were examined that passed through some of these. No agreement was reached and the Federal Cabinet agreed on 20 December 1989 to a recommendation of the Transport Minister to adopt the A3 route and, among other things, to include a station at Limburg.

DB then consulted with the states and community groups over the details of the route. In North Rhine-Westphalia there was considerable debate over the location of the station to serve the Bonn area and on how to serve the Cologne-Bonn Airport. DB decided that the station would be built at Siegburg and that a separate, double line would connect Cologne and the high-speed line to the south with Cologne-Bonn airport for the S-Bahn and ICE traffic.

In Hesse, DB decided to build the Limburg station south of the town at its current location on cost grounds, even though this prevented a connection to the Lahn valley line, which would have provided a connection to Koblenz and Gießen. Options for connections to Wiesbaden were examined in detail, including routing the line through its eastern outskirts. DB eventually agreed to a double-line spur to Wiesbaden along the A66. Options for connections to Frankfurt Airport, the line to Frankfurt Hauptbahnhof and to the Riedbahn (the line to Mannheim). It was decided that routing the line into the existing Frankfurt Airport station (now known as the regional train station) with two  tracks and a  track would not be adequate, even if expanded to four or five tracks. DB decided that a separate station across the A3 from the old station would be required and that the line would go on to connect to the Riedbahn both northbound (towards Frankfurt) and southbound (towards Mannheim).

Planning 

Although the route as set out above was adopted under the federal railway development law on 15 November 1993, the last legal challenge to the project was not resolved until September 1998. The route as finally designed was intended to allow trains to cover the distance between Cologne and Frankfurt in 58 minutes, although the current fastest time is 70 minutes, due to uncompleted work at rail junctions in Cologne and Frankfurt.

Construction 

The construction of the route began on 13 December 1995 with the turning of the first sod at the Frankfurter Kreuz autobahn junction and the last dispute over the route was settled in May 1997. On 13 May Federal Minister of Transport Matthias Wissmann in Siegburg turned the first sod in North Rhine-Westphalia. The last section to commence construction was the Schloss-Röttgen tunnel on the Cologne-Bonn airport loop, which was required in the settlement of a law case: work on it commenced in December 2000. The first section completed was the new Frankfurt airport station, which went into operation on 30 May 1999.

The opening of the whole route, which had originally been planned for 1999, took place after numerous court challenges and geological problems, at the end of July 2002. The last tracks of the route in the Schulwald tunnel were installed on 10 July 2001. In the same month the first trips with diesel locomotives were run to adjust the height of the overhead electric lines on the southern section. On 22 October 2001 for the first time an ICE 3 ran on the line, on a  section between Frankfurt airport and Idstein.

Opening and start-up 

The symbolic opening of the line took place on 25 July 2002 with a special train carrying approximately 700 honoured guests.  On 1 August 2002, the first passenger services commenced, originally with a two-hourly service and later with an hourly service.  In December 2002, the full service commenced, integration into the European timetable, although there were many disruptions to services in the first few months due to technical failures.

On 13 June 2004 the Cologne Bonn Airport loop was put into service.  At the end of September 2004 the Siegburg/Bonn station was finally completed.

Route

In Cologne ICE trains follow three paths to reach the high-speed line:
from the north (Düsseldorf or Wuppertal), running via the low level of Cologne Messe/Deutz railway station (tracks 11 and 12)
from the west (Aachen) through Cologne main station and over the Hohenzollern Bridge or from the north to the main station and then reversing to re-cross the Hohenzollern Bridge
from the north over the Hohenzollern Bridge to the main station and continuing around the western bypass of central Cologne and over the Cologne south bridge
The first two routes allow trains to run via Cologne–Bonn airport loop line, rejoining the main route at Cologne-Porz-Wahn.

The high-speed line's dedicated track begins in Cologne-Porz and are located between the Sieg Railway and the line from Gremberg yard and the Cologne south bridge, which, in effect, becomes the Right Rhine line when it separates at Troisdorf. At Troisdorf the HSL runs through a  tunnel under connecting lines that allow passenger trains running on the Sieg line to transfer to the Right Rhine line and freight trains on the freight lines to transfer to the Sieg line (and vice versa for northbound trains).

In Troisdorf the Right Rhine line leaves the high-speed line and runs through Bonn-Beuel towards Koblenz. The HSL follows the Siegstrecke to the rebuilt Siegburg/Bonn station and then heads south to run through the Siegauen Tunnel under the Sieg. At that very point it joins the A3, which it parallels south bound towards Frankfurt Airport.

In the Wiesbaden suburb of Breckenheim a double line connects to Wiesbaden, partly next to the A66 and then next to the Ländches Railway. Trains run into the Wiesbaden terminal station and can then reverse out to go to Mainz and Mannheim.

Construction on the approach to Cologne

Work is being carried out to create separate tracks for the high-speed line through the heavily used Cologne rail junction from its provisional connection to the conventional line at Köln Steinstraße, where trains are limited to  through the points.  The line is being extended to Cologne-Mülheim station through Cologne Messe/Deutz railway station (low level).  This work was intended to be part of the original high-speed line project, but was dropped to reduce costs.  When completed in 2008 this work will reduce the time between Frankfurt and Düsseldorf by 10 minutes.

See also 
 High-speed rail in Germany

References

External links 

 Official Video – showing an entire journey from Frankfurt to Cologne in one continuous shot from the rear of the train, 388 MiB)

High-speed railway lines in Germany
Railway lines in North Rhine-Westphalia
Railway lines in Rhineland-Palatinate
Railway lines in Hesse
Transport in Cologne
Transport in Frankfurt
Buildings and structures in Groß-Gerau (district)